This is a list of stationery topics. Stationery has historically pertained to a wide gamut of materials: paper and office supplies, writing implements, greeting cards, glue, pencil cases and other similar items.

Stationery topics

B

 Binder clip
 Black n' Red
 Brass fastener
 Bulldog clip
 Business card

 Black Astrum
 HCard
 Internet business card
 Portable Contacts
 Trade card
 VCard
 Visiting card

C

 Carbon paper
 Cartridge paper
 Chalkboard eraser
 Clipboard
 Colour pencil
 Compliments slip
 Continuous stationery
 Correction fluid
 Correction paper
 Correction tape
 Crane & Co.
 Crayon

D
 Derwent Cumberland Pencil 
 Drawing pin
 Dymotape

E

 E-card
 Embossing
 Embossing tape
 Engraving
 Envelope
 Eraser
 Esselte

F
 File folder
 Foolscap folio
 Fevicol

G
 Greeting card

 American Greetings
 Archies Ltd
 Baby announcement
 Cardmaking
 Cards (iOS)
 Carlton Cards
 Celebrations Group
 Christmas card
 Cookie bouquet
 CSS Industries
 Forever Friends
 Get-well card
 The Greeting Card Association (U.K.)
 Hallmark Cards
 Hallmark Business Connections
 Hallmark holiday
 Holiday greetings
 Hoops&Yoyo
 Irving I. Stone
 Marcus Ward & Co
 Moonpig
 Naughty cards
 New Year Card
 Nobleworks
 Recycled Paper Greetings
 Studio cards
 Touchnote
 Twisted Whiskers
 Uncooked
 Video ecard

H

 Highlighter
 Hipster PDA

I
 Index card
 ISO 216
 ISO 217

J

 Japanese stationery
 Copic
 Genkō yōshi
 Hobonichi Techo
 Kuretake (art products)
 Namiki
 Pentel
 Pilot (pen company)
 Shitajiki
 Tombow
 Triart Design Marker
 Tsujiura
 Uni-ball

K
 Knife (envelope)

L

 Label
 Lawyers bodkin
 Letter (paper size)
 Letterpress printing
 Liquid Paper

M
 Manila folder
 Marker pen
 Moleskine

N

 Needle card
 New Zealand standard for school stationery
 Notebook

 Big Chief tablet
 Classmate Stationery
 Composition book
 Diary
 Electronic lab notebook
 Inventor's notebook
 Lab notebook
 Open notebook science
 Personal organizer
 Police notebook
 Ring binder
 Sketchbook

P

 Paper
 Paper clip
 Paper cutter
 Paper Mate
 Paper size
 Pee Chee folder
 Pen
 Pencil
 Pencil Case
 Post-it note

 Postal stationery

 Aerogram
 Corner card
 Cut square
 Cut to shape
 Formular stationery
 Higgins & Gage World Postal Stationery Catalog
 Imprinted stamp
 International reply coupon
 Letter sheet
 Lettercard
 Mulready stationery
 Postal card
 Postal order
 Postal Stationery Society
 Postcard
 Sherborn Collection
 Stamped envelope
 United Postal Stationery Society
 Wrapper

 Presentation folder
 Pressure-sensitive adhesive
 Pressure-sensitive tape

R
 Royal Mail rubber band
 Rubber band
 Ruler
 rubber
 reading ruler

S

 Seal
 Smythson
 Spindle
 Springback binder
 Staple
 Stapler
 Stationers (companies)
 Stationers of the United Kingdom
 Basildon Bond
 Macniven and Cameron
 Paperchase
 Partners the Stationer
 Stationers (people)

 Edward Allde
 John Allde
 George Eld
 Theophilus Johnson
 John Masiakowski
 Leonard Pagliero
 Henry Wise

 Sticker

T

 teNeues
 Thermographic printing
 Tickler file
 Tipp-Ex
 Trade card
 Trapper Keeper
 Treasury tag

V

 Visiting card

W
 Watermark
 Wite-Out
 Worksheet
 Water colour
 Washi tape

References

Lists of inventions or discoveries
Office equipment
 
Lists of topics